The year 1977 in film involved some significant events.

Highest-grossing films (U.S.)

The top ten 1977 released films by box office gross in North America are as follows:

Events
 February 23 – During a press conference at Sardi's in Manhattan, it is officially announced that Christopher Reeve will be playing the role of Superman.
 March 28 – At the 49th Academy Awards, Rocky picks up the Academy Award for Best Picture. Peter Finch, Faye Dunaway, and Beatrice Straight all win Oscars for their performances in Network for Best Actor, Best Actress, and Best Supporting Actress, while Jason Robards wins for Best Supporting Actor for his performance in All the President's Men. He will win again the following year, becoming the only person to win two consecutive Best Supporting Actor awards.
 May 25 – Star Wars opens in theatres and becomes the highest-grossing film of the year. The film revolutionises the use of special effects in film and television production. It also embraces the notion of omitting any sort of opening credits sequence. Lucas, told by the Directors Guild of America that he must have an opening credits sequence, instead distributes the film independently, sans the opening credits. The film's release is often considered one of the most important events in film history.
June 22 – Walt Disney Productions releases The Rescuers, which brings back an interest in animation that had been lost to both filmgoers and critics throughout the beginning of the 1970s.
November 16 – Close Encounters of the Third Kind opens to widespread critical acclaim and massive box office success, becoming one of the top-grossing films to date and cementing Steven Spielberg's status as one of the most talented and profitable film directors of all time.
 December 5 – The Solar System, produced and directed by Thomas G. Smith for Encyclopaedia Britannica Films, is released. It led to the producer hiring Industrial Light & Magic (ILM), a company producing visual effects for films such as the Star Wars and Indiana Jones films.

Awards 

Palme d'Or (Cannes Film Festival):
Father and Master (Padre padrone), directed by Paolo and Vittorio Taviani, Italy

Golden Bear (Berlin Film Festival):
The Ascent (Voskhozhdeniye), directed by Larisa Shepitko, USSR

Notable films released in 1977
United States unless stated

#
 3 Women, directed by Robert Altman, starring Shelley Duvall, Sissy Spacek, Janice Rule
 21 Up, a TV made documentary film – (UK)

A
 ABBA: The Movie – directed by Lasse Hallström – (Sweden/Australia)
 Airport '77, starring Jack Lemmon, Lee Grant, Brenda Vaccaro, Christopher Lee, Olivia de Havilland, Joseph Cotten, James Stewart
 Alien Prey, directed by Norman J. Warren, starring Glory Annen – (UK)
 Alice or the Last Escapade (Alice ou la dernière fugue), directed by Claude Chabrol, starring Sylvia Kristel – (France)
 Allegro Non Troppo, a musical animated film – (Italy)
 Amar Akbar Anthony, starring Amitabh Bachchan – (India)
 The American Friend (Der amerikanische Freund), directed by Wim Wenders, starring Dennis Hopper and Bruno Ganz – (West Germany)
 Andy Warhol's Bad, starring Carroll Baker and Perry King
 Annie Hall, directed by and starring Woody Allen, with Diane Keaton, Tony Roberts, Carol Kane, Paul Simon
 Audrey Rose, directed by Robert Wise, starring Marsha Mason, Anthony Hopkins, John Beck
 The Ascent, directed by Larisa Shepitko – (USSR)
 An Average Little Man (Un borghese piccolo piccolo), directed by Mario Monicelli, starring Alberto Sordi – (Italy)

B
 Backroads, directed by Phillip Noyce – (Australia)
 The Bad News Bears in Breaking Training, starring Jackie Earle Haley and William Devane
 Black Joy, starring Norman Beaton – (UK)
 Black Sunday, directed by John Frankenheimer, starring Robert Shaw, Bruce Dern, Marthe Keller
 A Bridge Too Far, directed by Richard Attenborough, starring James Caan, Sean Connery, Gene Hackman, Anthony Hopkins, Laurence Olivier, Ryan O'Neal, Robert Redford – (US/UK)
 Brothers, starring Bernie Casey, Vonetta McGee, Ron O'Neal, Stu Gilliam, Renny Roker
 The Brothers Lionheart (Bröderna Lejonhjärta) – (Sweden)

C
 Candleshoe, starring David Niven, Helen Hayes, Jodie Foster
 The Car, starring James Brolin
 Ceddo, directed by Ousmane Sembène – (Senegal)
 Charleston, starring Bud Spencer, James Coco, Herbert Lom
 The Chess Players (Shatranj Ke Khilari), directed by Satyajit Ray – (India)
 Chinatown Kid (Tang ren jie xiao zi), directed by Chang Cheh – (Hong Kong)
 The Choirboys, directed by Robert Aldrich, starring Charles Durning, Louis Gossett Jr., Perry King, Phyllis Davis, Barbara Rhoades
 Cinderella, starring Cheryl Rainbeaux Smith
 Circuit no Ōkami (The Circuit Wolf) – (Japan)
 Citizen's Band, directed by Jonathan Demme, starring Paul Le Mat and Candy Clark
 Close Encounters of the Third Kind, directed by Steven Spielberg, starring Richard Dreyfuss, François Truffaut, Bob Balaban, Melinda Dillon, Teri Garr
 Cross of Iron, directed by Sam Peckinpah, starring James Coburn, Maximilian Schell, James Mason – (UK/West Germany)
 Crossed Swords, starring Oliver Reed, Raquel Welch, Rex Harrison, Charlton Heston, George C. Scott

D
 Damnation Alley, directed by Jack Smight, starring George Peppard and Jan-Michael Vincent
 Death of a President (Śmierć prezydenta) – (Poland)
 The Deep, directed by Peter Yates, starring Robert Shaw, Jacqueline Bisset, Nick Nolte, Louis Gossett Jr.
 Demon Seed, directed by Donald Cammell, starring Julie Christie
 Desperate Living, directed by John Waters
 The Devil Probably (Le diable probablement), directed by Robert Bresson – (France)
 Dharam Veer, starring Dharmendra – (India)
 Dinner for Adele (Adéla ještě nevečeřela) – (Czechoslovakia)
 The Disappearance, starring Donald Sutherland and David Hemmings
 The Dog Who Loved Trains – (Yugoslavia)
 The Domino Principle, directed by Stanley Kramer, starring Gene Hackman, Candice Bergen, Mickey Rooney, Eli Wallach, Richard Widmark
 Dot and the Kangaroo – (Australia)
 Double Murder, starring Marcello Mastroianni, Ursula Andress, Peter Ustinov
 The Duellists, directed by Ridley Scott, starring Keith Carradine and Harvey Keitel – (UK)

E
 Elisa, vida mía (Elisa, My Life), directed by Carlos Saura, starring Geraldine Chaplin and Fernando Rey – (Spain)
 Equus, directed by Sidney Lumet, starring Richard Burton and Peter Firth – (US/UK)
 Eraserhead, directed by David Lynch, starring Jack Nance
 Executioners from Shaolin (Hong Xi Guan) – (Hong Kong)
 Exorcist II: The Heretic, directed by John Boorman, starring Richard Burton, Linda Blair, Louise Fletcher

F
 First Love, starring Susan Dey, William Katt, Beverly D'Angelo
 Full Circle, aka The Haunting of Julia, starring Mia Farrow, Keir Dullea, Tom Conti
 Fun with Dick and Jane, directed by Ted Kotcheff, starring Jane Fonda and George Segal

G
 The Gauntlet, directed by and starring Clint Eastwood, with Sondra Locke
 The Getting of Wisdom, directed by Bruce Beresford – (Australia)
 Golden Rendezvous, starring Richard Harris, Ann Turkel, David Janssen
 The Goodbye Girl, directed by Herbert Ross, starring Richard Dreyfuss and Marsha Mason
 Grand Theft Auto, directed by and starring Ron Howard with Nancy Morgan
 The Grateful Dead Movie, directed by Jerry Garcia and Leon Gast
 The Greatest, starring Muhammad Ali as himself
 Gulliver's Travels

H
 Halloween with the New Addams Family
 Herbie Goes to Monte Carlo, directed by Vincent McEveety, starring Dean Jones and Don Knotts
 Heroes, starring Henry Winkler, Sally Field, Harrison Ford
 High Anxiety, directed by and starring Mel Brooks, with Madeline Kahn, Harvey Korman, Howard Morris, Cloris Leachman
 The Hills Have Eyes, directed by Wes Craven
 Hitler: A Film from Germany, directed by Hans-Jürgen Syberberg – (West Germany)
 The Hobbit, an animated film
 House (Hausu) – (Japan)
 The Hunters (Oi kynigoi), directed by Theodoros Angelopoulos – (Greece)

I
 I Never Promised You a Rose Garden, starring Kathleen Quinlan
 In the Name of the Pope King (In nome del papa re), starring Nino Manfredi – (Italy)
 In Search of Noah's Ark
 Iphigenia, directed by Michael Cacoyannis – (Greece)
 The Iron Prefect (Il prefetto di ferro) – (Italy)
 The Iron-Fisted Monk (San De huo shang yu Chong Mi Liu), directed by and starring Sammo Hung – (Hong Kong)
 The Island of Dr. Moreau, starring Burt Lancaster, Michael York, Barbara Carrera
 Islands in the Stream, starring George C. Scott

J
 J.A. Martin Photographer (J.A. Martin photographe) – (Canada)
 Jabberwocky, directed by Terry Gilliam, starring Michael Palin – (UK)
 Joseph Andrews, directed by Tony Richardson, starring Ann-Margret
 Jubilee, by Derek Jarman, starring Adam Ant, Toyah Willcox, Little Nell – (UK)
 Julia, directed by Fred Zinnemann, starring Jane Fonda, Vanessa Redgrave, Jason Robards

K
 The Kentucky Fried Movie, directed by John Landis, starring Bill Bixby and George Lazenby
 Kingdom of the Spiders, starring William Shatner and Tiffany Bolling
 The King of the Street Cleaners (Çöpçüler Kralı) – (Turkey)
 Die Konsequenz (The Consequence), directed by Wolfgang Petersen, starring Jürgen Prochnow – (West Germany)

L
 La Soufrière, a documentary film directed by Werner Herzog – (West Germany)
 The Lacemaker (La Dentellière), starring Isabelle Huppert – (France)
 The Last Remake of Beau Geste, directed by and starring Marty Feldman
 The Last Wave, directed by Peter Weir – (Australia)
 The Late Show, directed by Robert Benton, starring Art Carney, Lily Tomlin, Bill Macy, Eugene Roche, Joanna Cassidy
 A Little Night Music, starring Elizabeth Taylor, Lesley-Anne Down, Diana Rigg
 Looking for Mr. Goodbar, directed by Richard Brooks, starring Diane Keaton, Tuesday Weld, Richard Kiley, Richard Gere
 The Lorry (Le Camion), directed by and starring Marguerite Duras with Gérard Depardieu – (France)

M
 MacArthur, starring Gregory Peck
 Madame Rosa, starring Simone Signoret – Academy Award for Best Foreign Film – (France)
 The Magic Pony
 Ma-ma – (Romania/USSR/France)
 Mama, I'm Alive (Mama, ich lebe) – (East Germany)
 Man of Marble (Człowiek z marmuru), directed by Andrzej Wajda – (Poland)
 The Man Who Loved Women (L'Homme qui aimait les femmes), directed by François Truffaut, starring Charles Denner, Brigitte Fossey, Leslie Caron – (France)
 Manly Times, directed by Eduard Zahariev, starring Grigor Vachkov, Mariana Dimitrova, Velko Kanev – (Bulgaria)
 The Many Adventures of Winnie the Pooh
 March or Die, directed by Dick Richards, starring Gene Hackman, Catherine Deneuve, Max von Sydow
 Martin, directed by George A. Romero
 Mimino – (USSR)
 Mogliamante – (Wifemistress) – (Italy)
 Mr. Billion, starring Terence Hill, Valerie Perrine, Jackie Gleason

N
 Nasty Habits, starring Glenda Jackson, Melina Mercouri, Geraldine Page, Anne Jackson, Sandy Dennis
 Nenè – (Italy)
 New York, New York, directed by Martin Scorsese, starring Liza Minnelli and Robert De Niro
 A Nice Plate of Spinach (Což takhle dát si špenát) – (Czechoslovakia)

O
 Office Romance (Sluzhebnyy roman) – (USSR)
 Oh, God!, directed by Carl Reiner, starring George Burns, John Denver, Teri Garr, Paul Sorvino 
 One on One, starring Robby Benson, Annette O'Toole, G. D. Spradlin
 One Sings, the Other Doesn't (L'une chante, l'autre pas), directed by Agnès Varda – (France)
 Opening Night, directed by John Cassavetes, starring Gena Rowlands, Cassavetes, Ben Gazzara
 Orca, starring Richard Harris, Charlotte Rampling, Bo Derek
 The Other Side of Midnight, starring Marie-France Pisier, Susan Sarandon, John Beck, Clu Gulager, Raf Vallone
 Outlaw Blues, starring Peter Fonda and Susan Saint James

P
 Padre Padrone (Father and Master), directed by Paolo and Vittorio Taviani – (Italy) – Palme d'Or winner
 Pafnucio Santo – (Mexico)
 Pete's Dragon, directed by Don Chaffey, starring Helen Reddy, Jim Dale, Mickey Rooney
 The Picture Show Man, starring Rod Taylor – (Australia)
 A Piece of the Action, directed by and starring Sidney Poitier, with Bill Cosby and James Earl Jones
 Plae Kao (The Scar) – (Thailand)
 Providence, directed by Alain Resnais, starring John Gielgud, Dirk Bogarde, Ellen Burstyn – (France/Switzerland)
 Pumping Iron, a docudrama starring Arnold Schwarzenegger

R
 Rabid, starring Marilyn Chambers (Canada)
 Race for Your Life, Charlie Brown
 Raggedy Ann & Andy: A Musical Adventure, an animated film with the voices of Didi Conn and Mark Baker
 Rembrandt 1669 – (Netherlands)
 The Report (Gozāresh), directed by Abbas Kiarostami – (Iran)
 The Rescuers, animated film with voices of Eva Gabor and Bob Newhart
 Rollercoaster, starring Timothy Bottoms, George Segal, Richard Widmark, Henry Fonda
 Rolling Thunder, starring William Devane
 Roseland, starring Teresa Wright, Geraldine Chaplin, Lou Jacobi, Christopher Walken
 Ruby, starring Piper Laurie

S
 Saturday Night Fever, directed by John Badham, starring John Travolta and Karen Lynn Gorney
 Scott Joplin, starring Billy Dee Williams, Margaret Avery, Clifton Davis, Art Carney
 Semi-Tough, directed by Michael Ritchie, starring Burt Reynolds, Kris Kristofferson, Jill Clayburgh, Robert Preston, Bert Convy
 The Sentinel, starring Chris Sarandon, Cristina Raines, José Ferrer, Martin Balsam, Ava Gardner
 September 30, 1955, directed by James Bridges, starring Richard Thomas, Susan Tyrrell, Dennis Quaid, Tom Hulce, Dennis Christopher
 The Serpent's Egg, directed by Ingmar Bergman, starring David Carradine and Liv Ullmann – (US/West Germany)
 Short Eyes, directed by Robert M. Young, starring Bruce Davison and Jose Perez
Silver Blaze (British) a Sherlock Holmes mystery directed by John Davies, starring Christopher Plummer as Holmes and Thorley Walters as Watson
 Sinbad and the Eye of the Tiger, directed by Sam Wanamaker, starring Patrick Wayne and Jane Seymour – (US/UK)
 Slap Shot, directed by George Roy Hill, starring Paul Newman, Michael Ontkean, Lindsay Crouse, Strother Martin
 Smokey and the Bandit, directed by Hal Needham, starring Burt Reynolds, Sally Field, Jerry Reed, Jackie Gleason
 Soldier of Orange (Soldaat van Oranje), directed by Paul Verhoeven, starring Rutger Hauer – (Netherlands)
 Sorcerer, directed by William Friedkin, starring Roy Scheider
 A Special Day (Una giornata particolare), directed by Ettore Scola, starring Sophia Loren, Marcello Mastroianni, John Vernon – (Italy)
 Speedtrap, starring Joe Don Baker and Tyne Daly
 Spider-Man, starring Nicholas Hammond
 The Spy Who Loved Me, starring Roger Moore (as James Bond) with Barbara Bach, Curd Jürgens, Richard Kiel – (UK)
 Starship Invasions, starring Christopher Lee, Robert Vaughn, Helen Shaver
 Star Wars, directed by George Lucas, starring Mark Hamill, Harrison Ford, Carrie Fisher, Alec Guinness, Peter Cushing
 Stroszek, directed by Werner Herzog, starring Bruno S. and Eva Mattes – (West Germany)
 Suspiria, directed by Dario Argento, starring Jessica Harper, Stefania Casini, Alida Valli – (Italy)
 Sweeney!, starring John Thaw and Dennis Waterman – (UK)

T
 A Tale of Sorrow and Sadness (Hishū monogatari) – (Japan)
 Telefon, directed by Don Siegel, starring Charles Bronson and Lee Remick
 Tenda dos Milagres (Tent of Miracles), directed by Nelson Pereira dos Santos – (Brazil)
 Tentacles, starring John Huston, Shelley Winters, Henry Fonda
 That Obscure Object of Desire (Cet obscur objet du désir), directed by Luis Buñuel, starring Fernando Rey, Carole Bouquet, Ángela Molina – (France/Spain)
 That's Carry On!, a compilation film featuring Kenneth Williams and Barbara Windsor – (UK)
 Thunder and Lightning, starring David Carradine and Kate Jackson
 Tomorrow I'll Wake Up and Scald Myself with Tea – (Czechoslovakia)
 Tongpan – (Thailand)
 The Turning Point, directed by Herbert Ross, starring Shirley MacLaine, Anne Bancroft, Tom Skerritt, Mikhail Baryshnikov
 Twilight's Last Gleaming, directed by Robert Aldrich, starring Burt Lancaster, Richard Widmark, Charles Durning, Paul Winfield, Burt Young

U
 Unsichtbare Gegner directed by Valie Export – (Austria)

V
 Viva l'Italia! (I nuovi mostri), starring Vittorio Gassman and Ornella Muti – (Italy)
 Viva Knievel!, featuring Evel Knievel

W
 The War in Space – (Japan)
 Which Way Is Up?, directed by Michael Schultz, starring Richard Pryor, Margaret Avery, Lonette McKee
 White Bim Black Ear (Belyy Bim, Chyornoe ukho) – (USSR)
 The White Buffalo, starring Charles Bronson, Jack Warden, Will Sampson, Slim Pickens, Kim Novak
 Wilma, starring Shirley Jo Finney, Cicely Tyson, Denzel Washington
 The Wishing Tree – (USSR)
 Wizards – animated film directed by Ralph Bakshi
 The World's Greatest Lover, directed by and starring Gene Wilder, with Carol Kane, Dom DeLuise
 Wounded Game (Podranki) – (USSR)

Y
 The Year of the Hare (Jäniksen vuosi) – (Finland)
 The Yellow Handkerchief – (Japan)
 You Light Up My Life, starring Didi Conn

1977 Wide-release movies

January–March

April–June

July–September

October–December

Births
January 6 - Genevieve O'Reilly, Irish actress
January 7 – Dustin Diamond, American actor (d. 2021)
January 8 – Amber Benson, American actress
January 11 – Devin Ratray, American actor, producer and writer
January 12 – Piolo Pascual, Filipino actor 
January 13 – Orlando Bloom, English actor
January 14 – Ruco Chan, Hong Kong actor
January 15 – Ronald Zehrfeld, German actor
January 17 – Leigh Whannell, Australian screenwriter, actor, producer and director
January 19
Rob Delaney, American comedian, actor and writer
Taliesin Jaffe, American voice actor
January 28
Zhao Tao, Chinese actress
Joey Fatone, American singer and actor
January 29 – Justin Hartley, American actor
January 31
Bobby Moynihan, American actor, comedian and writer
Kerry Washington, American actress
February 9 – A. J. Buckley, Irish-Canadian actor
February 16 – Paul Brittain, American actor and comedian
February 17 – Isaac Kappy, American actor and musician (d. 2019)
February 18
Ike Barinholtz, American actor, comedian, writer, director and producer
Kristoffer Polaha, American actor
February 21 – Cyrine Abdelnour, Lebanese actress, and model
February 24
Libero De Rienzo, Italian actor (d. 2021)
Kate Mulvany, Australian actress, playwright and screenwriter
February 26 – James Wan, Australian director, producer and screenwriter
February 27 – Ji Sung, South Korean actor
March 2 – Heather McComb, American actress
March 8 – James Van Der Beek, American actor
March 9 – Lydia Mackay, American voice actress
March 15 – Brian Tee, Japanese-born American actor
March 19 – Jorma Taccone, American comedian, director, actor and writer
March 23 
 Joanna Page, Welsh actress and producer
 Edwin Siu, Hong Kong actor and singer
March 24
Olivia Burnette, American actress
Jessica Chastain, American actress
March 25 – Édgar Ramírez, Venezuelan actor
April 2 – Michael Fassbender, Irish-German actor
April 3 – Alice Lowe, English actress, writer and comedian
April 8 – Ana de la Reguera, Mexican actress
April 10 – Stephanie Sheh, American voice actress
April 14 – Sarah Michelle Gellar, American actress
April 16 – Tameka Empson, English actress
April 19 – Bryan Spears, American film and television producer 
April 20 – Robert Wilfort, English actor
April 23
John Cena, American professional wrestler and actor
Eric Edelstein, American actor
Kal Penn, American actor
April 24 – Eric Balfour, American actor and singer
April 25 – Marguerite Moreau, American actress
April 26 – Tom Welling, American actor
May 2 – Jenna von Oÿ, American actress
May 3 – Jeffrey Garcia, American actor and stand-up comedian
May 13 – Samantha Morton, English actress
May 14 – Jacky Ido, Burkinabé-born French actor
May 15 – Ben Whitehead, English actor, voice artist and read-in artist
May 16
Lynn Collins, American actress
Melanie Lynskey, New Zealand actress
Emilíana Torrini, Icelandic singer
May 18 – Evan Helmuth, American actor (d. 2017)
May 19 – Kelly Sheridan, Canadian voice actress
May 20 – Matt Czuchry, American actor
May 23
Richard Ayoade, British comedian, actor, filmmaker, writer, author and television presenter
Heather Wahlquist, American actress
May 27 – Anna Maxwell Martin, British actress
May 31 – Eric Christian Olsen, American actor
June 1 – Danielle Harris, American actress
June 2 – Zachary Quinto, American actor
June 3 – Pete Capella, American actor, stand-up comedian, producer and artistic director
June 5 – Liza Weil, American actress
June 14 – Sullivan Stapleton, Australian actor
June 22
 Bernadette Heerwagen, German actress
 Denis Moschitto, German actor
June 25 – Josh Braaten, American actor
June 30 – Christopher Sommers, Irish actor
July 1 – Liv Tyler, American actress
July 8 – Milo Ventimiglia, American actor
July 10
Chiwetel Ejiofor, English actor
Cary Joji Fukunaga, American director, producer, screenwriter and cinematographer
July 13 – Kari Wahlgren, American voice actress
July 24 – Danny Dyer, English actor and presenter
July 26 – Tony Sampson, Canadian oiler, former actor and voice artist
July 27 – Jonathan Rhys Meyers, Irish actor
July 30 – Jaime Pressly, American actress
August 2
Edward Furlong, American actor
Artemis Pebdani, American actress
Krzysztof Soszynski, Polish-Canadian actor and retired mixed martial artist
August 3 – Tómas Lemarquis, French-Icelandic actor
August 8 – Lindsay Sloane, American actress
August 10 – Yeşim Büber, Turkish actress 
August 18 – Mizuo Peck, American actress
August 23 – Kobna Holdbrook-Smith, Ghanaian-British actor
August 30
Michael Gladis, American actor
Elden Henson, American actor
September 8 – Nate Corddry, American actor and comedian
September 11 – Ludacris, American actor and rapper
September 15 – Tom Hardy, English actor
September 19 – Kyle Cease, American actor and comedian
September 25
 Divya Dutta, Indian actress
 Clea DuVall, American actress
September 27 – Michael C. Maronna, American actor
October 3 – Hassan Johnson, American actor, model and producer
October 5 – Luke Roberts (actor), English actor
October 7 – Brandon Quinn, American actor
October 8 – Jamie Marchi, American voice actress
October 11 – Matthew Bomer, American actor
October 16 – Tamara Podemski, Canadian actress
October 17 - Alimi Ballard, American actor
October 18 – Peter Sohn, American animator, voice actor, storyboard artist and director
October 19 – Jason Reitman, Canadian-American actor and filmmaker
October 20 – Sam Witwer, American actor and musician
October 26 – Jon Heder, American actor
October 29
Jon Abrahams, American actor
Brendan Fehr, Canadian actor
November 3 – Greg Plitt, American fitness model and actor (d. 2015)
November 4 – Tom Vaughan-Lawlor, Irish actor
November 10 – Brittany Murphy, American actress (d. 2009)
November 11 – Scoot McNairy, American actor
November 14 – Brian Dietzen, American actor
November 15 – Sean Murray, American actor
November 16 – Maggie Gyllenhaal, American actress
November 19 – Reid Scott (actor), American actor
November 21 – Michael Sorvino, American actor and producer
November 23 – Lateef Crowder dos Santos, Brazilian-American actor and stuntman
November 24 – Colin Hanks, American actor, director and producer
December 1 – Nate Torrence, American comedic actor
December 5 – Armando Riesco, Puerto Rican actor
December 8 
Maarja Jakobson, Estonian actress
Matthias Schoenaerts, Belgian actor
December 10 – Emmanuelle Chriqui, Canadian actress
December 15 – Geoff Stults, American actor
December 21
Colombe Jacobsen-Derstine, American actress
Kevin Miller (voice actor), American voice actor, comedian and podcast host
Gregory Siff, American writer and actor
December 30 – Lucy Punch, English actress

Deaths

Film debuts 
Dan Aykroyd – Love at First Sight
Raymond J. Barry – Between the Lines
Tom Berenger – The Sentinel
Hart Bochner – Islands in the Stream
Powers Boothe – The Goodbye Girl
Carole Bouquet – That Obscure Object of Desire
Guy Boyd – Between the Lines
Beverly D'Angelo – The Sentinel
Judy Davis – High Rolling
Brian Dennehy – Looking for Mr. Goodbar
Fran Drescher – Saturday Night Fever
Charles Fleischer – One on One
Mel Gibson – I Never Promised You a Rose Garden
Steve Guttenberg – Rollercoaster
Luis Guzmán – Short Eyes
Mark Hamill – Wizards
John Heard – Between the Lines
Helen Hunt – Rollercoaster
Michael Ironside – Outrageous!
Joe Mantegna – Medusa Challenger
Bruce McGill – Handle with Care
Michael McKean – Cracking Up
Kevin McNally – The Spy Who Loved Me
Richard Moll – Brigham
Joe Morton – Between the Lines
Sam Neill – Sleeping Dogs
Pete Postlethwaite – The Duellists
Bill Raymond – Sudden Death
Richard Riehle – Joyride
Chelcie Ross – Keep My Grave Open
William Sanderson – Fight for Your Life
Meryl Streep – Julia
Sven-Ole Thorsen – Mind Your Back, Professor
Stephen Tobolowsky – Keep My Grave Open
Craig Wasson – Rollercoaster
Sigourney Weaver – Annie Hall
Robin Williams – Can I Do It... 'Till I Need Glasses?
Lambert Wilson – Julia
Rita Wilson – The Day It Came to Earth

References 

 
Film by year